Tristan Pfaff (born 23 April 1985) is a French pianist, trained at the Conservatoire de Paris under Michel Béroff. He is noted for a Franz Liszt Album on iTunes and may be considered one of the main pianists of his generation.

References 

  2007 Scottish International Piano Competition

1985 births
Living people
21st-century French male classical pianists
Conservatoire de Paris alumni
Long-Thibaud-Crespin Competition prize-winners